Elliot Werk (born April 16, 1957) is a Democratic politician from Boise, Idaho in the United States. From 2002 until 2015 he served as the Idaho State Senator from District 17, which is based in the Boise Bench neighborhood.

Werk was born in Montreal, Quebec, Canada, and emigrated to the United States when he was seven years old. He became a naturalized United States citizen while in college. After living in various locations throughout the United States, Werk moved to Idaho in the late 1990s with his family.

Werk was elected to the Idaho Senate in 2002, defeating Republican incumbent Grant R. Ipsen and  Libertarian candidate David H. Slack. He was reelected to a sixth term in 2012 by a nearly 2-1 margin.

In January 2009 Werk succeeded Kate Kelly as assistant minority leader in the Idaho Senate. Kelly in turn became minority leader succeeding Clint Stennett, who battled brain cancer during the 2009 and 2010 sessions and died in October 2010.

In February 2015 Werk resigned from the Idaho Senate to take a position on the Idaho State Tax Commission. He was succeeded by Boise City Council president Maryanne Jordan.

References

External links

Idaho Legislature - Senator Elliot Werk official government website
Elliot Werk official campaign website
Project Vote Smart - Senator Elliot Werk (ID) profile
Follow the Money - Elliot Werk
2008 2006 2004 2002 campaign contributions

1957 births
Canadian emigrants to the United States
Democratic Party Idaho state senators
Living people
People from Montreal